The 1955 Prince Edward Island general election was held in the Canadian province of Prince Edward Island on May 25, 1955.

The governing Liberals of Premier Alex W. Matheson increased their majority in the Legislature, winning three more seats over the opposition Progressive Conservatives led by Reginald Bell, who would resign as leader in 1957 following this election. Matheson took over as premier from his predecessor J. Walter Jones in May 1953 following his appointment to the Senate.

This election marked the first and only time (as of 2016) that a party has won six consecutive general elections on Prince Edward Island.

Party Standings

Members Elected

The Legislature of Prince Edward Island had two levels of membership from 1893 to 1996 - Assemblymen and Councillors. This was a holdover from when the Island had a bicameral legislature, the General Assembly and the Legislative Council.

In 1893, the Legislative Council was abolished and had its membership merged with the Assembly, though the two titles remained separate and were elected by different electoral franchises. Assembleymen were elected by all eligible voters of within a district, while Councillors were only elected by landowners within a district.

Kings

Queens

Prince

Sources

1955 elections in Canada
Elections in Prince Edward Island
1955 in Prince Edward Island
May 1955 events in Canada